Col Dawid Schoonwinkel was an officer in the South African Army from the artillery.

Military career 

He joined the SADF in 1979 at 4 Field Regiment and completed the national service. He was appointed as an instructor at the School of Arty. He saw action in various roles during the Border War in Angola with 14 and 4 Artillery Regiments. He served as Battery Commander, Officer Commanding 4 Artillery Regiment, Second in Command School of Artillery from 1999-2006, SSO Research & Development 2006-2008 and OC School of Artillery in 2008 until his retirement in 2020.

Honours and awards

Medals

Proficiency badges

References 

South African military officers
Living people
1960 births
Afrikaner people
South African people of Dutch descent
South African military personnel of the Border War